The Zhukov Air and Space Defense Academy, or formally the Military Academy of Air and Space Defence named after Marshal of the Soviet Union G. K. Zhukov is a Russian military academy located on the banks of the Volga River in Tver (formerly Kalinin). The academy, formed in 1956, is named after Soviet Marshal Georgy Zhukov. It was one of the main education centers of the Russian Aerospace Defence Forces, prior to the Aerospace Defence Forces restructuring in 2015. The Academy currently trains personnel for the successor organisation, the Russian Aerospace Forces.

In addition to its educational and training mandate, this academy is a research center for studying problems of operational art and tactics, as well as command, communications, and control (C3) on air defense matters.

Notable alumni

2022 fire
On 21 April 2022 a fire destroyed buildings at the Academy with seven reported dead.

References

External links
Official website
Solemn graduation ceremony at the Zhukov Air and Space Defense Academy and the Suvorov Military School of Tver

Military academies of Russia
Military education and training in the Soviet Union